2002 Kashima Antlers season

Competitions

Domestic results

J.League 1

Emperor's Cup

J.League Cup

Final Stage

International results

Asian Club Championship

First Round

Second Round

Quarterfinals

Player statistics

References

Other pages
 J. League official site

Kashima Antlers
Kashima Antlers seasons